Cleopas Dube (born 29 March 1990) is a Zimbabwean professional footballer who plays as a forward for Uthongathi.

Career
Dube began his footballing career in Zimbabwe with ZPC Hwange. He left in 2013 to join Highlanders, before being loaned out to Bulawayo Chiefs. In 2014, Dube joined National First Division side Witbank Spurs in South Africa. He made his Spurs and professional career debut on 31 August in a league win against Cape Town All Stars. In his next match for the club, on 14 September, Dube scored his first goal in a defeat to Highlands Park. That was his only goal in 2014–15, but he subsequently scored thirteen in twenty-four in 2015–16. Ahead of 2016–17, Dube joined newly-promoted South African Premier Division club Baroka.

Dube scored once in ten appearances before leaving Baroka in January 2017. In February 2017, after leaving Baroka, Dube joined National First Division side Stellenbosch. He made sixteen appearances in all competitions for the club in 2016–17. In July, Dube joined fellow NFD side Royal Eagles. He made his debut against Uthongathi, prior to scoring his first goal in his second match versus Highlands Park; the same opponent he scored his first Spurs goal for. Dube rejoined Witbank Spurs in January 2018. He scored in his first match back, getting a late consolation in a 2–1 defeat to Ubuntu Cape Town on 7 January.

In June 2019, following relegation with Witbank, Dube remained in the National First Division after agreeing terms with Uthongathi.

Career statistics
.

Honours
Highlanders
Cup of Zimbabwe: 2013

References

External links

1990 births
Living people
People from Matabeleland North Province
Zimbabwean footballers
Zimbabwean expatriate footballers
Zimbabwean expatriate sportspeople in South Africa
Expatriate soccer players in South Africa
Association football forwards
Zimbabwe Premier Soccer League players
National First Division players
South African Premier Division players
Highlanders F.C. players
Witbank Spurs F.C. players
Baroka F.C. players
Stellenbosch F.C. players
Royal Eagles F.C. players
Uthongathi F.C. players